Baconton is a city in Mitchell County, Georgia, United States. As of the 2020 census, the city had a population of 856, down from 915 in 2010.

History
Baconton was incorporated in 1903. The community was named after Major Robert James Bacon, an original owner of the town site.

Geography
Baconton is located in northern Mitchell County at  (31.376002, -84.161468). U.S. Route 19 runs along the eastern border of the city, leading south  to Camilla, the county seat, and north  to Albany.

The Flint River passes  to the west of the city.

Soils of Baconton are mostly well drained or somewhat excessively drained. They have grayish brown loamy sand topsoils overlying yellowish brown or red sandy clay loam subsoils. All belong to the Ultisol soil order. Where agricultural or urban development have not occurred, these soils support mixed forests dominated by pines and oaks.

Demographics

2020 census

As of the 2020 United States census, there were 856 people, 335 households, and 288 families residing in the city.

2000 census
As of the census of 2000, there were 804 people, 289 households, and 212 families residing in the city. The racial makeup of the city was 59.83% African American, 37.56% White,  0.87% Native American, 0.12% Pacific Islander, 0.50% from other races, and 1.12% from two or more races. Hispanic or Latino of any race were 1.12% of the population.

There were 289 households, out of which 37.0% had children under the age of 18 living with them, 38.1% were married couples living together, 30.1% had a female householder with no husband present, and 26.3% were non-families. 23.2% of all households were made up of individuals, and 11.1% had someone living alone who was 65 years of age or older.  The average household size was 2.78 and the average family size was 3.22.

In the city, the population was spread out, with 30.6% under the age of 18, 10.0% from 18 to 24, 27.0% from 25 to 44, 20.8% from 45 to 64, and 11.7% who were 65 years of age or older.  The median age was 32 years. For every 100 females, there were 88.3 males.  For every 100 females age 18 and over, there were 78.3 males.

The median income for a household in the city was $22,917, and the median income for a family was $25,714. Males had a median income of $22,063 versus $15,978 for females. The per capita income for the city was $9,964.  About 29.4% of families and 31.2% of the population were below the poverty line, including 51.4% of those under age 18 and 17.6% of those age 65 or over.

Education
The Mitchell County School District serves Baconton students, as well as Camilla students.
Public Schools
North Mitchell County Elementary School
Charter Schools
Baconton Community Charter Schools

References

External links

Cities in Georgia (U.S. state)
Cities in Mitchell County, Georgia